Nicholas Hay, 2nd Earl of Erroll ( – 1470) was a Scottish peer. He was the second Earl of Erroll and the third Lord Hay of Erroll.

Biography

Nicholas Hay was the son of William Hay, 1st Earl of Erroll and Lady Beatrix Douglas, daughter of James Douglas, 7th Earl of Douglas. Nicholas was the great-great-grandson of King Robert II of Scotland and his first wife, Elizabeth Mure.

He had a contract to Lady Margaret, daughter of Alexander Gordon, 1st Earl of Huntly which for some reason did not take place; he instead married her sister, Lady Elizabeth, on 15 November 1461.

She secondly married John Kennedy, 2nd Lord Kennedy; she had a charter for life and on her death in 1500, left the lands of Cassillis and Dunure to the Kennedys.

The family seat was Slains Castle. He died without issue and the earldom passed to his brother, William.

References

 

1436 births
1470 deaths
15th-century Scottish people
02
Nicholas, 02